Gammelgarn Church is a medieval church in Gammelgarn on the Swedish island of Gotland. The largely Gothic church stands next to an older defensive tower. The church's main portal is richly decorated with medieval sculpture, and the interior contains an altarpiece from the 14th century of high craftsmanship. The church is in the Diocese of Visby of the Church of Sweden.

History

The church is built next to a defensive tower, erected in the 12th century and probably built to protect the congregation from raiders from across the Baltic Sea. The present-day church is largely from the 14th century. Only the tower remains of an older church on the same site. The tower was originally part of the nave of this first, Romanesque church. The current tower roof dates from 1755.

Architecture
The church is a High Gothic building, characterised by a spacious nave, divided into four vaults by a single central column. The choir lacks an apse and instead the eastern end of the church is adorned with three Gothic windows.

Possibly the most noteworthy part of the church is the southern portal, which is richly sculpted. Dating from the 14th century, it was made by the Gotlandic workshop or sculptor commonly referred to by the notname Egypticus. The portal displays scenes from the Old Testament.

The interior of the church contains fragments of medieval murals. The altarpiece is an piece dating from the 14th century of fine craftsmanship, and the church also has a medieval baptismal font. There is also a medieval gravestone slab in the floor of the choir, which is inscribed with runes. Other furnishings date from the late 17th century (the pulpit) and the 18th century (choir stalls and pews).

References

Further reading

External links

Official site (in Swedish) 

Churches in Gotland County
Churches in the Diocese of Visby
Gothic architecture in Sweden
Church frescos in Sweden
14th-century churches in Sweden
Fortified church buildings
Churches converted from the Roman Catholic Church to the Church of Sweden